The 1996 Gangneung submarine infiltration incident began on 18 September 1996, near the South Korean city of Gangneung when North Koreans abandoned their grounded submarine, and hid within the city resulting in 49 day long manhunt for the belligerents.

The incident was one of the more serious instances of North Korean espionage involving the Reconnaissance Bureau (reconnaissance team and 22nd Squadron of the Maritime Department of the Reconnaissance Bureau). The raid was launched by North Korean armed spies to assassinate the President of South Korea, Kim Young-sam, during his visit to Chuncheon, on 5 October 1996.

Months after the start of the incident North Korea issued a rare apology for the events and ensuing loss of life.

Landing 
Their mission was to spy on the naval installations in the area and then return. However, the larger mission was the assassination of South Korean President Kim Young-sam. The "reconnaissance team" alongside the submarine was to help drop off the "assassination" team, survey government facilities, and return. The "assassination team" was to assassinate president Kim Young-sam at Chuncheon, a nearby city. President Kim was planning to visit Chuncheon to open a national sports event to be held on 7 October.

The submarine made a failed attempt to collect the team on the 16th and returned the following day. On the 17th it ran aground in the attempt, and all efforts to free her were unsuccessful.

The crew then decided to destroy the sensitive equipment in the submarine by starting a fire inside. They then split up in several groups unnoticed until one group was soon spotted by a local taxi driver around 1:00 AM who became suspicious by their clothing and behavior and alerted the authorities, who quickly mobilized.

Manhunt 
A 49-day-long manhunt ensued, from September 18th to November 5th, resulting in the capture or death of all of the commandos except one, who is believed to have made it back to North Korea. 

Four civilians and 12 South Korean soldiers (eight KIA and four in accidents) died; 27 soldiers were wounded. Of the 25 North Korean infiltrators, one was captured, 11 were killed by the other members for failure in responsibility of running aground of the submarine, and 13 were killed in firefights with the South Korean Army.

The infiltrators possessed among their arsenal M16A1 rifles (with accompanying 5.56mm NATO ammunition) and imitation South Korean-style military uniforms. Nestlé Crunch chocolate bars were also recovered. Some of the dead spies' corpses were displayed to the media; some were wearing South Korean-style military uniforms as disguises.

Though the last infiltrator has never been found, officials announced the end of the manhunt on November 5th, believing the commando to have either escaped across the border or died.

Timeline of belligerent casualties 
18 September, 16:40 – 1 captured by local policemen
18 September, 17:00 – 11 bodies of executed submarine crew members were found
19 September, 10:00 – 3 killed by the South Korean army commandos
19 September, 14:00 – 3 killed by the South Korean army special forces
19 September, 16:00 – 1 killed by the South Korean army
21 September, 20:00 – 1 killed by the South Korean army
22 September, 06:00 – 1 killed by the South Korean army
28 September, 06:30 – 1 killed by the South Korean army
30 September, 16:00 – 1 killed by South Korean special forces
5 November, 10:00 – 2 killed by South Korean special forces

Evidence of activity inside South Korea 
Amidst the manhunt, at least two of the North Korean infiltrators spent a night playing video games at a nearby ski resort (Yongpyong Resort) according to their diaries and rolls of film left behind. The resort is located about 18 miles away from where their submarine ran aground. Film rolls showed pictures taken of a variety of South Korean military installations around. The diary further tells of how the pair lived for two weeks in a shelter they dug in the side of a mountain before making the push north to the border. In all they claim to have travelled some 80 total miles during the manhunt. On their way north they stabbed to death three civilian hikers they encountered and in a separate encounter strangled a South Korean Army private who set out to collect firewood. The bodies of the hikers were discovered soon after. The private was believed to be a deserter until one of the North Koreans was found wearing his uniform.

Responses 
South Korean officials from both the governing party and opposition party, as well as major newspapers criticized the military for failing to detect the submarine.
: President Kim Young-sam considered the incident to be a significant provocation and announced that any further actions could lead to war.
: Kwon Young-hae, director of the National Intelligence Service, called it an "armed provocation perpetrated to carry out guerilla warfare."
: On December 29 an apology was issued by North Korea for the incident and the loss of life.
: On October 15th the UN Security Council officially rebuked North Korea for its actions. China joined in after careful scrutiny of the wording. The statement was the first time the UNSC addressed the Korean peninsula since the end of the Korean war in 1953.

Aftermath 

The Sang-O class submarine was salvaged and remains on display at Tongil (Unification) Park near Gangneung.

North Korea was at first reluctant to take responsibility, claiming that the submarine had suffered an engine failure and had drifted aground. By 29 December, however, the North issued an official statement expressing "deep regret" over the submarine incident. In reciprocity, the South Korean government returned the cremated remains of the soldiers to the North via Panmunjom the very next day, the first event of its kind between the neighboring countries.

Some analysts suspected that the motivation behind the assassination of Choe Deok-geun, South Korean consul for the Russian Far East, was North Korean retaliation for the loss of their men.

Lee Kwong-soo, the only captured North Korean, remained in South Korea and reportedly became an instructor for the ROK Navy.

See also
1998 Sokcho submarine incident
Fushin-sen

References

Bibliography
Harry P. Dies, Jr.: North Korean Special Operations Forces: 1996 Kangnung submarine infiltration, Military Intelligence Professional Bulletin, Oct-Dec 2004.

External links
 Pictures and information regarding the display. 
The story and pictures of the North-Korean submarine near Jeongdongjin

Espionage scandals and incidents
Maritime incidents in 1996
Korean People's Navy
Conflicts in 1996
1996 in South Korea
1996 in North Korea
Gangneung
Maritime incidents in South Korea
North Korea–South Korea relations
Mass shootings in Asia
Military history of South Korea
September 1996 events in Asia
October 1996 events in Asia
November 1996 events in Asia